The 43rd Mixed Brigade was a unit of the Spanish Republican Army that took part in the Spanish Civil War. During the war it came to operate on the Madrid, Levante and Extremadura fronts.

History 
The unit was created on 26 November 1936 from the forces commanded by Lieutenant Colonel Juan Arce Mayora on the Madrid front, in addition to troops from the Escobar Column — which was composed of members of the old Land and Freedom Column and by civil guards from the 19th Tercio of Barcelona. Later, militia forces were added from the Toledo sector. Initially, the unit was called mixed brigade "A".

On 31 December 1936, the 43rd Mixed Brigade was added to the 6th Division of the Madrid Army Corps. For more than a year the unit remained located on the Madrid front, without taking part in relevant military operations. In mid-1938, before the nationalist offensive it was sent to the Levante front where it was incorporated into the 52nd Division and operated in the Catarroja sector. In August, the brigade was sent to the Extremadura front, being placed in reserve at Hinojosa del Duque. It remained situated on this front until the end of the war. The unit ceased to exist at the end of March 1939.

During its existence, the 43rd Mixed Brigade published a newspaper called "Frente de Extremadura".

Controls 
 Lieutenant Colonel Juan Arce Mayora;
 Militia major Victoriano González Marcos;
 Militia major Antolín Serrano García;
 Militia major Miguel Torrús Palomo;

 Commissioners
 Rafael Sobrado Cossío;
 Alberto Barral López;

 Chiefs of Staff
 Commander of the General Staff Federico de la Iglesia Navarro;
 Militia captain José Vallejo González;

Notes

References

Bibliography
 
  
 
 
 
 

Military units and formations established in 1936
Military units and formations disestablished in 1939
Mixed Brigades (Spain)
Military units and formations of the Spanish Civil War
Military history of Spain
Militarized anarchist formations
Armed Forces of the Second Spanish Republic